John Brownlie (born 11 March 1952) is a Scottish former football player and coach, currently assistant manager of East Stirlingshire.

Brownlie played as a right back for Pumpherston Juniors, Hibernian, Newcastle United, Middlesbrough, Hartlepool United, Berwick Rangers, Blyth Spartans and the Scotland national team. Brownlie later managed Cowdenbeath, Meadowbank Thistle, East Stirlingshire, Arbroath and Berwick Rangers.

Playing career

Brownlie joined Hibernian from Pumpherston Juniors in 1969 and remained at Easter Road for nine years. He was part of the 1972 League Cup winning team and also earned runners-up medals in 1972 (Scottish Cup) and 1974 (League Cup).

He later played for Newcastle United, Middlesbrough, Hartlepool United, Berwick Rangers and Blyth Spartans. Following his retirement in 1986, he ran a hotel in the English North-East.

Coaching career

In 1988 Brownlie gained his first managerial appointment at Cowdenbeath and won promotion from the Scottish Second Division before his departure in 1992.

He subsequently joined Clyde, where he worked as assistant manager under Alex Smith, before managing East Stirlingshire from 1997 until 1998.

After a spell running the youth teams at Raith Rovers, Brownlie managed Arbroath between 2000 and 2003 where he led the club to promotion from the Scottish Second Division and kept them in the Scottish First Division for two seasons.

He later returned to East Stirlingshire as a coach, taking temporary charge of the first team in 2008 after the resignation of Gordon Wylde.

Brownlie was appointed manager of Berwick Rangers in May 2019 ahead of a relegation play-off, which they lost to Cove Rangers. He was replaced by Ian Little as Berwick manager after they were relegated to the Lowland League.

Brownlie rejoined East Stirlingshire as a coach in July 2020, and later stepped up to become assistant manager of the club after Andy Rodgers left on 4 January 2021.

Personal life
His son Paul was also a professional footballer.

Honours and achievements

Player
Hibernian
Scottish League Cup winners (1): 1972–73

Manager
Cowdenbeath
Scottish Second Division: promotion 1991–92

Arbroath
 Scottish Second Division: promotion 2000–01

Career statistics

International

Managerial record

 Arbroath statistics come from soccerbase website.
 Cowdenbeath, Meadowbank Thistle and East Stirlingshire statistics not currently available.

References

External links 

John Brownlie, www.ihibs.co.uk

1952 births
Living people
Footballers from North Lanarkshire
Scottish footballers
Scotland international footballers
Hibernian F.C. players
Newcastle United F.C. players
Middlesbrough F.C. players
Hartlepool United F.C. players
Berwick Rangers F.C. players
Blyth Spartans A.F.C. players
Scottish Football League players
English Football League players
Scottish Junior Football Association players
Scottish football managers
Cowdenbeath F.C. managers
East Stirlingshire F.C. managers
Arbroath F.C. managers
Livingston F.C. managers
Scottish Football League representative players
Scottish Football League managers
Scotland under-23 international footballers
Association football defenders
Berwick Rangers F.C. managers
Scottish Professional Football League managers
Pumpherston Juniors F.C. players